Sprent is both a given name and surname. Notable people with the name include:

 Sprent Dabwido (1972–2019), Nauruan politician; former President of Nauru.
 James Sprent (1808–1863), Surveyor General of Tasmania
 Janet Sprent (born 1934),  British botanical scientist and professor

Other Uses
 Sprent, Tasmania, a locality in Australia